In 2012 it was estimated that there were between 40 and 42 million prostitutes in the world. The list of countries below provides an estimate for the number of people working as prostitutes in each country. China, India, and the United States are the countries with the most prostitutes.

Methodology
There are a number of difficulties involved in collecting meaningful prostitution statistics. For example, the greater visibility of some forms of prostitution, such as street prostitution, makes statistics on these forms easier to collect. However, in some countries street prostitution forms a much smaller part of the sex industry than indoor prostitution. Similarly sex workers with health, addiction and other support needs are more likely to be known to the authorities and hence easier for researchers to contact, but may not be representative of prostitution as a whole.  National Ugly Mugs, a support organisation for sex workers in the United Kingdom, has identified several factors making it difficult to collect statistics for the sex industry, including low response rates, the small scale of research compared to the size of the sex industry, and the diversity of the industry. As a result published statistics are often conflicting and contested.

In countries where prostitution is illegal, the use of arrest data to create general prostitution statistics can be misleading. The majority of prostitutes are never arrested, and those who are, can often be charged with other offences instead. Class bias may be introduced into the statistics as a result of police officers being more likely to arrest street prostitutes than high-class call girls. In comparing one area with another there may be differences in the definition of a crime, the police enforcement rate, and the possibility of the inflation of arrest figures or the under-reporting of crime.

Due to the unregulated and often illegal nature of the work, only estimates are available for the number of prostitutes in a country. The numbers for a country can vary considerably dependent on the source. Some countries' numbers may suffer from poor methodology. In other cases, results may be influenced by whether the organisation producing the numbers is for or against the nature of the work. Where available, figures are taken from Joint United Nations Programme on HIV/AIDS 2016 "Sex Workers: Size Estimates."

References 

Sex workers
Sexuality-related lists